Ruggero Cini (30 November 1933 – 8 April 1981) was an Italian composer, producer, arranger and conductor.

Life and career 
Born in Scandicci, Cini started his career in the second half of the 1960s, collaborating as arranger with several artists of RCA Italiana, notably Luigi Tenco, The Rokes, Fred Bongusto and Dino. He debuted as composer in 1967, with the song "Bisogna saper perdere", presented at the 17th edition of the Sanremo Music Festival by Lucio Dalla and The Rokes.

In 1968 Cini got his major hit with the Patty Pravo's song "La Bambola". In the following years he collaborated intensively with Lucio Dalla and Renato Zero, and had some experiences as a film composer, scoring films such as The Three Fantastic Supermen (1967), Open Season (1974), and Martin Eden.

References

External links

 

1933 births
1981 deaths
People from Scandicci
Italian male composers
Italian songwriters
Male songwriters
Italian record producers
Italian music arrangers
Italian male conductors (music)
20th-century Italian conductors (music)
20th-century Italian male musicians